For other localities in Madagascar with the same name, please check:  Andramasina (disambiguation)

Andramasina is a town in Analamanga Region, in the  Central Highlands of Madagascar south of Antananrivo. It is the administrative capital of Andramasina District.

Lakes & Rivers
 Lake Ambohimanjaka
 Sisaony river

References

Populated places in Analamanga